Anthony Armstrong may refer to:

 Anthony Armstrong (American football) (born 1983), American football player
 Anthony Armstrong (writer) (1897–1972), Anglo-Canadian writer
 Anthony Armstrong (musician)

See also
 Antony Armstrong-Jones, 1st Earl of Snowdon (1930–2017), British photographer and film maker
 Tony Armstrong (disambiguation)